Demic diffusion, as opposed to trans-cultural diffusion, is a demographic term referring to a migratory model, developed by Luigi Luca Cavalli-Sforza, of population diffusion into and across an area that had been previously uninhabited by that group and possibly but not necessarily displacing, replacing, or intermixing with an existing population (such as has been suggested for the spread of agriculture across Neolithic Europe and several other Landnahme events).

In its original formulation, the demic diffusion model includes three phases: (1) population growth, prompted by new available resources as in the case of early farmers, and/or other technological developments; (2) a dispersal into regions with lower population density; (3) a limited initial admixture with the people encountered in the process.

Evidence
Theoretical work by Cavalli-Sforza showed that if admixture between expanding farmers and previously-resident groups of hunters and gatherers was not immediate, the process would result in the establishment of broad genetic gradients. Because broad gradients, spanning much of Europe from southeast to northwest, were identified in empirical genetic studies by Cavalli-Sforza, Robert R. Sokal, Guido Barbujani, Lounès Chikhi and others, it seemed likely that the spread of agriculture into Europe occurred by the expansion and the spread of agriculturists, who possibly originated in the Fertile Crescent of the Near East. That is referred to as the Neolithic demic diffusion model.

Craniometric and archaeological studies have also arrived at the same conclusion.

References

External links
 Estimating the Impact of Prehistoric Admixture on the Genome of Europeans, Dupanloup et al., 2004 
Origin, Diffusion, and Differentiation of Y-Chromosome Haplogroups E and J: Inferences on the Neolithization of Europe and Later Migratory Events in the Mediterranean Area, 2004
 Y genetic data support the Neolithic demic diffusion model, Chikhi 2002. 
 Paleolithic and Neolithic lineages in the European mitochondrial gene pool, Cavalli-Sforza 1997.
 Clines of nuclear DNA markers suggest a largely Neolithic ancestry of the European gene, Chikhi 1997.

Demographics